Nyasha Mutsauri (born 10 March 1991) is a Zimbabwean beauty pageant titleholder  who was crowned Miss Global Zimbabwe 2013, becoming the official representative of her country to Miss Global International Miss Globe International.

Early life
Nyasha Mutsauri was raised in Harare. She was born in 1991 and was a student of Communications in South Africa.

Miss Global Zimbabwe 2013
She was crowned as the 2nd Miss Global Zimbabwe at an event held at the Crowne Plaza Hotel on 5 July 2013.

Miss Global International 2013
Nyasha Mutsauri could not travel to Miss Global International 2013 which was held in Jamaica due to family reasons. However her Director Tare Munzara managed to make a plan to ensure that she represents Zimbabwe at another international Pageant.

Miss Globe International
She is the official representative for Zimbabwe for Miss Globe international 2014.

References

1991 births
Living people
Miss Globe International